is a railway station on the Chūō Main Line in the town of Fujimi, Suwa District, Nagano Prefecture, Japan, operated by East Japan Railway Company (JR East).

Lines
Fujimi Station is served by the Chūō Main Line and is 182.9 kilometers from the terminus of the line at Tokyo Station.

Station layout
Fujimi Station hasten ground-level side platform and one island platform connected by a footbridge. The station has a Midori no Madoguchi staffed ticket office.

Platforms

History
The station opened on 21 December 1904. With the privatization of Japanese National Railways (JNR) on 1 April 1987, the station came under the control of JR East.

Passenger statistics
In fiscal 2015, the station was used by an average of 924 passengers daily (boarding passengers only).

Surrounding area

Fujimi Town Hall
Fujimi High School

See also
 List of railway stations in Japan

References

External links

  

Railway stations in Nagano Prefecture
Chūō Main Line
Railway stations in Japan opened in 1904
Stations of East Japan Railway Company
Fujimi, Nagano